Recombinant vesicular stomatitis virus vaccines (rVSV vaccines) are vaccines made using recombinant Indiana vesiculovirus. rVSV vaccines include:

Vaccines
rVSV-ZEBOV vaccine against Ebola

Vaccine candidates
rVSV-SUDV vaccine, a candidate against Sudan ebolavirus (development discontinued for business reasons)
rVSV-MARV vaccine, a candidate against the Marburg virus (development discontinued for business reasons)
rVSV-based vaccine candidate against Lassa fever
An HIV vaccine candidate